Syntomeida wrighti is a moth in the subfamily Arctiinae. It was first described by Juan Gundlach in 1881 and is found on Cuba.

Taxonomy
The species was previously incorrectly synonymized with Syntomeida syntomoides.

References

Moths described in 1881
Euchromiina
Endemic fauna of Cuba